James Edward Britt (February 25, 1856 – February 28, 1923), was a professional baseball player who played pitcher from 1872 to 1873 for the Brooklyn Atlantics.

External links

1856 births
1923 deaths
Major League Baseball pitchers
Baseball players from New York (state)
Brooklyn Atlantics players
19th-century baseball players